The  was a tracked armored personnel carrier (APC) developed by the Imperial Japanese Army in World War II.

Development and history
The Type 1 Ho-Ki was produced as a result of a request from the army for a heavy armored artillery tractor, which could also serve as a personnel transport in order to increase the motorization and cross-country capabilities of the land forces. Several prototypes were built. The first one built on a Type 92 tankette chassis was known as the Type TC. The second prototype built was known as the Type TE. Development of both tracked and half-track APCs intensified in 1941, with two production versions confusingly designated “Type 1" (see the Type 1 Ho-Ha half-track).

The fully tracked Type 1 Ho-Ki was built by Hino Motors, but only in small quantities. Although the Japanese Army had employed mechanized infantry formations in China from the mid-1930s, the general view of field commanders was that armored transports were too slow compared with normal trucks, and thereby unable to keep up with the speed necessary for contemporary infantry tactics. In addition, with the priorities of Japanese military production focusing on combat aircraft, warships and other offensive weaponry, most of the experimental APC and AFV designs never made it past the prototype stage. By the time the Type 1 Ho-Ki entered mass production in 1944, raw materials were in very short supply, and much of Japan's industrial infrastructure had been destroyed by American bombing. The total number produced is unknown.

Design

The Type 1 Ho-Ki had an unusual silhouette, in that the driver's cab did not extend across the front of the hull, but stopped about mid-way across the center line. Only one driver was required, who manipulated the left and right movement of the tracks via a pair of small steering wheels. The crew consisted of a driver and commander, with transport capacity of fourteen or fifteen seated men, and the maximum armor thickness was 6 mm for the front hull.

The Type 1 Ho-Ki had been designed to be versatile. It was designed to be used to carry supplies, to tow artillery, as well as to carry infantry. They were produced in three basic variants, a supply carrier, artillery prime mover and armored personnel carrier. The Type 1 Ho-Ki had from the left (driver's) side three doors mounted side by side for exit. In addition, the armored personnel carrier variant had a rear hinged double door for troop exit. The hull was welded construction and it was "open-topped", akin to the Type 1 Ho-Ha. The engine compartment was located at the right front of the body, next to the driver's compartment. The engine was a 6-cylinder, in-line, valve-in-head, air-cooled diesel. The transmission was located in the rear. The gearbox had eight forward gears and two reverse gears. This allowed for more flexibility in speed and torque, in accordance to where and how it was being used.

The Type 1 Ho-Ki was not normally armed, but provision was made for mounting machine guns to the rear of the driver on the sides of the troop compartment. The Type 92 Heavy Machine Gun carried by Japanese infantry squads could be mounted accordingly. Although it was an APC, it was often mistakenly called a half-track.

Combat record

Initial deployment of the Type 1 Ho-Ki was to China for operations in the Second Sino-Japanese War. The Type 1 Ho-Ki was later deployed to Burma and the Philippines in 1944. Units of the 2nd Tank Division were reassigned to the Japanese Fourteenth Area Army and sent to the Philippines, where it was deployed on the main island of Luzon. The 2nd Tank Division had a shortage of half-tracks, therefore, at least four Type 1 Ho-Ki's were used for troop transport on Luzon during the Battle of the Philippines.

Notes

References

External links
Taki's Imperial Japanese Army Page - Akira Takizawa

Armoured personnel carriers of Japan
Tracked armoured personnel carriers
1 Ho-Ki
Toyota Group
Military vehicles introduced from 1940 to 1944
Armoured personnel carriers of WWII